Cut Bank is a city in and the county seat of Glacier County, Montana, United States, located just east of the "cut bank" (gorge) along Cut Bank Creek. The population was 3,056 at the 2020 census, The town began in 1891 with the arrival of the Great Northern Railway.

Geography
Cut Bank is located in eastern Glacier County at  (48.634801, −112.331090). U.S. Route 2 passes through the city as Main Street, leading east  to Interstate 15 at Shelby and west  to Browning. The Blackfeet Indian Reservation is located just west of Cut Bank, on the western side of Cut Bank Creek.

The name of the city comes from the cut bank (gorge)  a scenic hazard to navigation and a geologic feature of the same name. The Cut Bank Creek river is spanned cliffs to cliffs by a scenic elevated railway bridge high above the canyon floor less than a mile from the edge of the town.

Demographics

2010 census
As of the 2010 census, there were 2,869 people, 1,249 households and 739 families residing in the city. The racial makeup of the city was 74.7% White, 0.2% African American, 19.0% Native American, 0.5% Asian, 0.4% from other races, and 5.2% from two or more races. Hispanic or Latino of any race were 2.5% of the population.

There were 1,249 households, of which 30.3% had children under the age of 18 living with them, 43.4% were married couples living together, 10.6% had a female householder with no husband present, 5.1% had a male householder with no wife present, and 40.8% were non-families. 35.7% of all households were made up of individuals, and 14.6% had someone living alone who was 65 years of age or older. The average household size was 2.26 and the average family size was 2.94.

The median age was 41.2 years. 24.4% of residents were under the age of 18; 7.7% were between the ages of 18 and 24; 22.4% were from 25 to 44; 28.8% were from 45 to 64; and 16.8% were 65 years of age or older. The gender makeup of the city was 48.2% male and 51.8% female.

Transportation
Cut Bank is served by Amtrak's Empire Builder long-distance train on its route from Chicago to Seattle/Portland. There is one eastbound and one westbound train per day.

A train of the same name served the city under Amtrak's predecessor, the Great Northern Railway. The city, in conjunction with Amtrak and the current track owner BNSF Railway, recently repainted its historic train station in the traditional Great Northern depot colors.

The city contains an important railroad freight yard operated by the BNSF.

Cut Bank Municipal Airport is three miles southwest of Cut Bank.

Education
Cut Bank Public Schools educates students from kindergarten through 12th grade. Cut Bank High School's team name is the Wolves.

Cut Bank has a public library, called the Glacier County Library.

Climate
Cut Bank experiences a semi-arid climate (Köppen BSk) with long, cold, dry winters and short, warm, wetter summers. In winter, bitterly cold arctic air masses move south and impact the eastern side of the American Continental Divide. During such invasions Cut Bank, with its comparatively high elevation and topography is frequently the coldest location in the lower 48 U.S. States. Being close to the eastern slopes of the Rocky Mountains also makes the area subject to occasional Chinook winds that can rapidly increase the local temperature.

Notable people
Gerard Jones, comic book writer, born in Cut Bank
Rosalie Mae Jones/Daystar, choreographer and dancer, founder of Daystar Contemporary Dance-Drama of Indian America
James C. Nelson, Montana Supreme Court justice
Rob Quist, musician
Glenn Roush, Montana state legislator
Hart Merriam Schultz, American Indian artist
Gloria Jean Siebrecht, amateur paleontologist
Alexis Wineman, Miss Montana 2012
Danielle Wineman, Miss Montana 2015

See also
 Cut Bank (film)
 Cut Bank station
 List of oil pipelines

References

External links

 City of Cut Bank official website

Cities in Glacier County, Montana
County seats in Montana
Cities in Montana